The Freedom 100 was an automobile race held annually at the Indianapolis Motor Speedway in Speedway, Indiana, as part of the Indy Lights Presented by Cooper Tires. The event was a support race for the IndyCar Series Indianapolis 500, and since 2005, it was held on the Friday preceding the Indianapolis 500, the day known as "Carb Day".

The Freedom 100 was the second race annually at the Indianapolis Motor Speedway, the other being the Grand Prix on the combined road course.

Race history

The Freedom 100 has its origins in both USAC's Mini Indy series and CART's ARS/Indy Lights series. None of those support series ever raced at the Indianapolis Motor Speedway. Typically the support series would take the month of May off while the top-level Indy cars were at the Indianapolis 500. In 1979, USAC's Mini-Indy series scheduled a support race on the oval at nearby Indianapolis Raceway Park, but it was held only once.

When the IRL started the Indy Pro Series in 2002, officials began exploring the possibility of holding a support race at Indianapolis in the days leading up to the Indianapolis 500. It was an attempt to fill an otherwise slow part of the month, and an opportunity for exposure for up-and-coming drivers and teams. The race was added to the calendar for 2003.

For the first two years, the race was held during the second weekend of Indianapolis 500 time trials, scheduled for Saturday which was at the time, used only for Indy 500 practice. The date proved to be unpopular and drew small crowds. In 2005, Carb Day, the traditional final day of practice for the Indy 500, was moved from Thursday before the Indy 500 to Friday. Series officials moved the Freedom 100 to Carb Day, immediately following the final Indy 500 practice session. The move proved popular with fans and competitors.

In 2008, in the wake of the merger between IRL and Champ Car, the series was renamed from Indy Pro Series to the Firestone Indy Lights Series, taking the name of Champ Car's former development series which had ceased in 2001. The new sponsorship extended to this race, renaming it the Firestone Freedom 100.

In the first nine runnings, the race was won six times from the pole and three times from second starting position.  Therefore, the race had always been won from the front row until Esteban Guerrieri won in 2012 from the 18th starting position. In 2013, Peter Dempsey, who started third, won the Freedom 100 in what was then the closest finish in Speedway history (0.0026 secs) in a four-wide finish over Gabby Chaves, Sage Karam, and Carlos Muñoz. Dempsey went from fourth to first on the final straightaway. 

In 2016, the field lined up in order of points, as qualifying has been rained out. Pole sitter and series point leader, Carlin's Ed Jones, traded the lead with Andretti Autosport's Dean Stoneman until a caution on lap 36 slowed the field. The green flag flew with one lap to go and Stoneman pulled alongside Jones going into Turn Three. The pair held their positions through the North Short Chute and into Turn Four; as they crossed the line, Stoneman held the lead by the slimmest possible margin, winning by 0.0024 seconds - a new Indianapolis Motor Speedway Record. 

Carlin's Matheus Leist took the race victory from pole position in 2017, while Colton Herta earned the win in 2018. Herta's Freedom 100 victory made it a clean sweep of the month of May for the young second-generation driver, who won both Indy Lights races on the road course at the INDYCAR Grand Prix.

In 2019, Andretti Autosport's Oliver Askew took the race win in typically dramatic fashion, passing teammate Ryan Norman at the line by a mere 0.0067 seconds - the fourth closest finish in the history of the Indianapolis Motor Speedway. There were 12 official lead changes at the start/finish line, but nearly 100 passes for position throughout the 40-lap race. The race starting order was altered post-qualifying when five cars failed post-qualifying technical inspection and were relegated to the back of the field, though this number did not include pole sitter Robert Megennis.

The 2020 edition of the race was cancelled after the Indy Lights season was also cancelled. The race was axed from Lights' 2021 calendar. IndyCar took responsibility for the move, claiming it was to ensure for a smooth Indianapolis 500 weekend.

Race results

a In 2003 the race started on Saturday May 17, but was halted by rain. It was completed the following day.
b The 2008 race was scheduled for Friday May 23 but postponed one day due to rain.
c In 2012, Anders Krohn qualified for the race, but was unable to start due to mechanical problems. He was credited with the 19th-place finish. Therefore, only 18 cars took the green flag.

Qualification results

 Five cars in the field had their qualifying runs disallowed for failing technical inspection, leaving only six official times.

Event records

Drivers

In the first seventeen years that this race has been contested, 166 drivers have participated:

Freedom 100 and Indianapolis 500 "Double"
Since the Freedom 100 began in 2003, four different drivers have competed both in this race and in the Indianapolis 500, during the same month.

Sources
Firestone Indy Lights stats
Champ Car Stats - Indy Lights/Indy Pro Series

References

External links

Formula races
Indy Lights
Auto races in the United States
Motorsport in Indianapolis
Recurring sporting events established in 2003
Recurring sporting events disestablished in 2020
2003 establishments in Indiana
2020 disestablishments in Indiana